The Yeongdo Ha clan is a Korean clan, which is a group of people that share the same paternal ancestor and is indicated by the combination of a Bon-gwan and a family name (or clan name). Its registered locality is in Yeongdo District, Busan. According to research conducted in 2000: four people belong to the clan. The clan was founded by Robert Holley, a former international lawyer originally from the United States. He renounced his American citizenship, and formed the Yeongdo Ha clan after gaining his Korean citizenship.

See also 
 Korean clan names of foreign origin
Yeongdo District
Bon-gwan
Robert Holley

References

External links